Currer is a surname, and may refer to:

 Frances Mary Richardson Currer (1785–1861), British heiress and book collector
 Herbert Currer (born 1916), South African lawn bowler and footballer
 Ian Currer,  author of books on parasailing, windsurfing, and kitesurfing

See also
 Currier (disambiguation)
 Currer Bell, pseudonym of Charlotte Brontë